Bratronice is a municipality and village in Strakonice District in the South Bohemian Region of the Czech Republic. It has about 60 inhabitants.

Administrative parts
The hamlet of Katovsko is an administrative part of Bratronice.

References

External links

Villages in Strakonice District